Adrianne Harun is an American writer of prose. Her debut novel, A Man Came Out of a Door in the Mountain (a book about "where evil comes from", according to the author), was published by Penguin in 2014. Claire Vaye Watkins called the book a "breathless, absorbing novel", and the book received many other positive reviews, one reviewer describing it as the "buzz book of the season".

References

External links

Living people
21st-century American novelists
American women novelists
21st-century American women writers
Year of birth missing (living people)